Rice production in the Philippines is an important aspect of the country's food supply and economy. The Philippines is the 8th largest rice producer in the world, accounting for 2.8% of global rice production. The Philippines was also the world's largest rice importer in 2010.

Rice production

Geography of production 
Rice is the most important food crop, a staple food in most of the country. It is produced extensively in Luzon, the Western Visayas, Southern Mindanao, and Central Mindanao.

Total production 
In 2010, nearly 20.7 million metric tons of palay (pre-husked rice) were produced. In 2010, palay accounted for 21.86% percent of gross value added in agriculture and 2.37% of GNP.

In 2017, the total paddy rice output met 93% of the country's annual requirement. The population consumed 11.7 million tonnes of rice.

History 

Historically, the per hectare rice yields in the Philippines have generally been low in comparison with other Asian countries.

The Green Revolution 

Since the mid-1980s yields have increased substantially as a result of the cultivation of high-yielding rice varieties developed in the mid-1960s at the International Rice Research Institute located in the Philippines. The proportion of "miracle" rice in total output rose from zero in 1965–66 to 81 percent in 1981–82.  Average productivity increased from 1.23 metric tons per hectare in 1961 to 3.59 metric tons per hectare in 2009.

This green revolution was accompanied by an expanded use of chemical inputs.  Among farmers surveyed in Central Luzon, the quantity of insecticide active ingredient applied per hectare increased tenfold from 1966 to 1979, from less than 0.1 kilogram per hectare to nearly 1.0 kilogram per hectare. By the mid-1990s, this figure had been cut in half. Since then, use has declined even more, and levels of insecticide use are now slightly below what they were before the Green Revolution began.

Growth of irrigation 

The government also undertook a major expansion of the nation's irrigation system. The area under irrigation grew from under 500,000 hectares in the mid-1960s to 1.5 million hectares in 2009, almost half of the potentially irrigable land.

In the 1980s rice production encountered problems. Average annual growth for 1980-85 declined to a mere 0.9 percent, as contrasted with 4.6 percent for the preceding fifteen years. Growth of value added in the rice industry also fell in the 1980s. Tropical storms and droughts, the general economic downturn of the 1980s, and the 1983-85 economic crisis all contributed to this decline.

Crop loans dried up, prices of agricultural inputs increased, and palay prices declined. Fertilizer and plant nutrient consumption dropped 15 percent. Farmers were squeezed by rising debts and declining income. Hectarage devoted to rice production, level during the latter half of the 1970s, fell an average of 2.4 percent per annum during the first half of the 1980s, with the decline primarily in marginal, nonirrigated farms. As a result, in 1985, the last full year of the Marcos regime, the country imported 538,000 tons of rice.

The situation improved somewhat in the late 1980s, and smaller amounts of rice were imported. In 1990 the country experienced a severe drought. Output fell by 1.5 percent, forcing the importation of an estimated 400,000 tons of rice.

As of 2018, the Philippines had a WTO-approved annual quota limiting private rice imports to protect local farmers, buying up to 805,200 tonnes of rice with a 35 percent
import tariff.

Genetic engineering 
The government has promoted genetically modified rice, including Golden rice, for production in the country.

See also 
 Agriculture in the Philippines

References

Agriculture in the Philippines
Philippines